The 2022 season was UiTM FC's 14th in existence and their 1st season in the second-tier of Malaysian football since relegation last season. The team competed in Malaysia Premier League, the Malaysia FA Cup and the Malaysia Cup.

Ismail Ibrahim has been appointed as the club's new head coach.

Coaching staff

 Head coach: Ismail Ibrahim
 Assistant head coach: Shahreen Nizam Sharudin
 Goalkeeping coach: Abd Jalil Man
 Fitness coach: Zaiham Abd Hamid
 Team doctor: Wan Mohamad Izham
 Physiotherapist: Ahmad Hanbal Raman

Players

First-team squad

Transfers in

Statistics

Appearances and goals

|-
! colspan="18" style="background:#dcdcdc; text-align:center"| Goalkeepers

|-
! colspan="18" style="background:#dcdcdc; text-align:center"| Defenders

|-
! colspan="18" style="background:#dcdcdc; text-align:center"| Midfielders

|-
! colspan="18" style="background:#dcdcdc; text-align:center"| Forwards

|-
! colspan="18" style="background:#dcdcdc; text-align:center"| Players transferred out during the season

|-

Competitions

Malaysia Premier League

Malaysia FA Cup

Malaysia Cup

Round of 16

References

UiTM
UiTM FC